The 2021 Coppa Sabatini (also known as the Gran Premio città di Peccioli) was the 69th edition of the Coppa Sabatini road cycling one day race, which was held on 16 September 2021 as part of the 2021 UCI Europe Tour and the 2021 UCI ProSeries calendars.

The race's hilly route covered  in and around Peccioli, located in the Province of Pisa in Tuscany, and had three parts, each of which started and finished in Peccioli. The first part was a  circuit that featured the hills of Montefoscoli, Terricciola, Lajatico, and the Piazza del Popolo hill in Peccioli. Riders then took on five laps of a  circuit with all the aforementioned hills except Lajatico. The race concluded with three laps of a  circuit, which finished atop the Via Mazzini hill in Peccioli.

Neilson Powless was the first to try a solo attack, but he was brought back with under  to go. In the final kilometre, Gianni Moscon tried to accelerate away but was quickly closed down, before Powless's teammate Michael Valgren, winner of the Giro della Toscana the day before, made what would be the winning acceleration. Only Sonny Colbrelli, the recently crowned European road race champion, was able to follow Valgren. In the finishing straight, Valgren continued to accelerate, distancing Colbrelli for the victory. From the rest of the contending octet, Mathieu Burgaudeau finished third.

Teams 
Seven of the 19 UCI WorldTeams, eight UCI ProTeams, two UCI Continental teams, and the Italian national team made up the eighteen teams that participated in the race. Each team entered a squad of seven riders, for a total of 126 riders. Only 49 riders finished the race.

UCI WorldTeams

 
 
 
 
 
 
 

UCI ProTeams

 
 
 
 
 
 
 
 

UCI Continental Teams

 
 

National Teams

 Italy

Result

References

Sources

External links 
  

Coppa Sabatini
Coppa Sabatini
Coppa Sabatini
Coppa Sabatini